Hello Central, Give Me Heaven is a popular Tin Pan Alley song first published in 1901, with lyrics and music by Charles K. Harris, and was among Harris's most popular songs.  It was first recorded by Byron G. Harlan and released in July 1901.

The song relates a young girl wishing to use the telephone ("Hello Central" refers to the operator) to call her dead mother.   It was inspired by a newspaper story relating the attempt of the seven-year-old daughter of a widower to make such a call.   Postcards were printed after the song's publication with the "kind permission" of Harris showing young girls using the telephone to call their dead mothers.

The song's popularity led to several "telephone songs" in the following years, and a one-reel film of the same title was released in 1913.

It has been estimated that the sheet music sold approximately one million copies.

The Carter Family also recorded a version of the song.

Lyrics

Film 
A one-reel film of the same title was released in 1913. Prints and/or fragments were found in the Dawson Film Find in 1978.

References

External links
 Byron G. Harlan recording, U.S. Library of Congress
 1901 sheet music

1901 songs
Songs written by Charles K. Harris
Songs about telephone calls
Songs about death
Songs about mothers